Dead by Sunrise (formerly known as Snow White Tan) was an American rock supergroup formed in Los Angeles, California in 2005 by vocalist Chester Bennington who was best known as the lead vocalist of Linkin Park. The band also consisted of Amir Derakh, Ryan Shuck, Brandon Belsky, Elias Andra, and Anthony "Fu" Valcic from Julien-K and Orgy. Dead by Sunrise's debut studio album, Out of Ashes, was released worldwide on October 13, 2009.

History

Out of Ashes (2005–2009)
Dead by Sunrise started to form in 2005 while Chester Bennington was writing songs for Linkin Park's album Minutes to Midnight. According to Bennington, "I came up with a few songs that felt and sounded really good, but I knew they weren’t right stylistically for Linkin Park. They were darker and moodier than anything I’d come up with for the band. So I decided to work on them on my own rather than turn them over and have them transformed into Linkin Park tracks." However, the foundation for Dead by Sunrise was laid much earlier, when future bandmate Shuck met Bennington during the recording of Linkin Park's first album Hybrid Theory. In an interview, Shuck states that "I always used to go to his house and hear him play acoustic guitar. And I always thought to myself, 'Oh my God, these are such good songs.'"

The band's name, which was previously "Snow White Tan", reflects the time during the album's recording. In an interview, Bennington stated that:

On May 10, 2008, Dead by Sunrise performed three songs ("Walking in Circles", "Morning After", and "My Suffering") at the 13th anniversary party for Club Tattoo in Tempe, Arizona. The song titled "Morning After" was written by Chester Bennington and originally performed on September 12, 2001 at the Live in Berlin concert. Bennington also performed Morning After with his cover band entitled Bucket Of Weenies in many shows throughout 2005 and 2006. This was the first time that Bennington had "officially" performed the song under a new name—Dead by Sunrise. In addition, this band toured with Linkin Park in Europe, Japan, and America. In an interview with MTV, Bennington stated that "we're actually going to be jumping in the middle of Linkin Park's set, playing a few songs, then jumping out and letting LP finish out the set." During their debut European tour the band took time out to send a message to the German Armed Forces.

Recording of the band's debut album began in July 2008 after touring for Linkin Park had finished. Working simultaneously on his solo album and Linkin Park's next record, Bennington recorded Out of Ashes with producer Howard Benson and bandmates from Julien-K. Bennington wrote most of the songs on an acoustic guitar before working with his band to reshape the track into hard rock, a ballad, or even removing all rock influence and creating a synth-driven track. Linkin Park bandmate Mike Shinoda confirmed that Out of Ashes is "much more of a rock album [than Linkin Park's albums]." Also of note, Bennington participated in all aspects of creating the record, including programming and production.

Videos were filmed for "Crawl Back In" (September 8, 2009) and "Let Down" with the songs serving as the album's first two singles. "Crawl Back In" reached the 11th spot on the Mainstream Rock chart.

Later career, hiatus, and death of Chester Bennington (2010–2018)
In a 2009 interview with Billboard, Bennington said that "This isn't a one-time thing for us. Every five years or so I could imagine there'd be a Dead By Sunrise record." Despite this, in 2010, he stated there was a small chance a new album may be created. The frontman also noted that because of Linkin Park's new direction "it becomes very difficult to choose where the songs that he writes will go."

On November 4, 2011, Bennington's wife, Talinda, revealed that Dead by Sunrise will perform at the 2011 Stars of the Season Gala event, which focused on raising donations for pediatric rehabilitation.

On April 20, 2012, during a Love and Death concert played at an event by The Whosoevers, Elias Andra announced that in December 2011 he had left the band. Later that year the band replaced Andra with Frank Zummo from Street Drum Corps. The band had been inactive since this time.

On July 20, 2017, lead vocalist Chester Bennington died by suicide in his home in California. The band made an official statement on their Facebook page on July 29. Band members Ryan Shuck and Amir Derakh along with Grey Daze member Mace Beyers were united to perform a tribute for Bennington in an acoustic concert on September 2 in Las Vegas.

They later took part in Linkin Park's memorial concert for Chester Bennington on October 27, 2017. They performed "One Step Closer" alongside Korn vocalist Jonathan Davis.

In September 2018, Julien-K performed the One More Light 2 memorial in Milan Italy to honor Chester Bennington with a massive number of Italian fans. They performed as Julien-K and ended the set as Dead By Sunrise along with Italian guest singers.

Members
 Chester Bennington – lead vocals 
 Amir Derakh – lead guitar 
 Ryan Shuck – rhythm guitar, backing vocals 
 Elias Andra – drums, percussion 
 Brandon Belsky – bass 
 Anthony "Fu" Valcic – keyboards, synthesizers 
 Frank Zummo – drums, percussion

Timeline

Discography

Albums

Studio albums

Singles

Other charted songs

Promotional singles

Music videos

References

 
Musical groups established in 2005
Musical groups disestablished in 2012
Musical groups reestablished in 2017
Musical groups disestablished in 2017
Warner Records artists
Alternative rock groups from California
American electronic rock musical groups
Julien-K
Linkin Park
Musical groups from Los Angeles
2005 establishments in California
2012 disestablishments in California